Haplochromis rubescens is a species of cichlid endemic to the Rwandan portions of Lake Kivu.  This species can reach a length of  SL.

References

rubescens
Fish described in 1994
Taxonomy articles created by Polbot